The Lebanese Civil Defense or General Directorate of the Lebanese Civil Defense is a public emergency medical service of Lebanon that carries out patient transportation, search and rescue activities and fire-fighting response.

It is funded and administered by the Ministry of Interior and Municipalities (Lebanon). The directorate works in conjunction with the Lebanese Red Cross along with other pre-hospital service organizations in the country. The current Director General of the Lebanese Civil Defence is General Raymond Khattar.

See also
Lebanese Defense forces related topics:
 Lebanese Sea Rescue Unit 
 Ministry of National Defense
 Lebanese Air Force
 Lebanese Navy
 Lebanese Special Forces
 Lebanese Red Cross

Civil Defence related topics:
 Blast shelter
 Civil-defense Geiger counters
 Civil defense siren
 Effects of nuclear explosions on human health
 Emergency management
 Fallout shelter
 Nuclear warfare
 Survivalism
 Transarmament
 Weapon of mass destruction
 Civil defense by country

References

External links
 General Directorate of the Civil Defense Facebook page
 Civil Defense Simulation - Mount Lebanon Hospital - By YASA on YouTube
 General Darwish Hobeika on Gettyimages.co.uk
 Interview with General Darwish Hobeika regarding forest firsts on YASA website
 Video on the UNDP Civil Defense project in Lebanon

Emergency services in Lebanon
Lebanese governmental organisations
Firefighting by country
Medical and health organisations based in Lebanon